A blowing house or blowing mill was a building used for smelting tin in Cornwall and on Dartmoor in Devon, in South West England. Blowing houses contained a furnace and a pair of bellows that were powered by an adjacent water wheel, and they were in use from the early 14th century until they were gradually replaced by reverberatory furnaces in the 18th century. The remains of over 40 blowing houses have been identified on Dartmoor.

History
The blowing house method of smelting tin was probably introduced early in the 14th century to replace the earliest method of smelting which had to be done in two stages – a first smelting probably took place near to the tinworks and the roughly smelted metal was taken to a stannary town to be smelted again to produce the final refined product. Each of these smeltings was taxed separately until 1303 when they were replaced by a single tax on the finished product. It is likely that this tax change was due to the improved smelting process provided by the blowing houses.

Documentation confirms the existence of blowing houses in Cornwall as early as 1402, but the earliest reference for Dartmoor is not found until the early 16th century, though it is likely that they were in use on the moor earlier. In Devon there are many references to blowing mills throughout the 16th and 17th centuries, reflecting the boom time in tin-mining on Dartmoor. However, by 1730 there were only two blowing mills working in the whole of the county: at Sheepstor and Plympton.

From the beginning of the 18th century, this method was gradually superseded by reverberatory furnace smelting, which used higher temperatures and powdered anthracite as fuel and had the advantage of not requiring a forced draught of air. The smelting house at Eylesbarrow tin mine which was in operation during the first half of the 19th century had two furnaces, one of each type.

Construction
They were made of unmortared granite blocks with walls often  or more thick and probably had turf or thatch roofs which were periodically burnt to retrieve the particles of tin that would have been driven into the roof through the blast from the bellows.

The only contemporary detailed description of a blowing house was provided by a Cornishman named William Pryce in his treatise on Cornish mining of 1778:

According to Crispin Gill, about two tons of charcoal was needed to smelt a ton of metal. The molten metal ran out from the bottom of the furnace into a granite trough or "float" from where it was ladled into stone moulds.

Archaeology
Archaeological investigation of blowing houses started in 1866 when John Kelly examined the lower mill at Yealm Steps. Robert Burnard cleared the interior of the lower mill at Week Ford in the 1880s, but the most notable researcher of the remains on Dartmoor was R. Hansford Worth who made detailed records of over 40 sites. Since then, research on the tin industry in the south west has continued, for instance The Dartmoor Tinworking Interest Group was formed in 1991.

There is evidence for furnaces that match the description given by Pryce (see above) at Upper and Lower Merrivale, Avon Dam and Blacksmith's Shop. The Merrivale sites also have a slab at the back, making a basic hearth shape. The accompanying photograph shows the two side slabs of the furnace at the Lower Merrivale blowing house, with the somewhat displaced float stone between them. The mouldstone, filled with rainwater, is just above and to the right.

The mouldstone is the best field evidence for a blowing house; they are large blocks of granite with a flat top containing a rectangular hollow recess into which the molten tin was poured to be cast into ingots. Some mouldstones have additional smaller hollows on their surface; these are traditionally assumed to be for assaying purposes, but some authors have suggested that they may have been for making small ingots for selling illicitly to avoid tin coinage, the tax on white, or refined tin.

The only properly documented find of a tin ingot from Dartmoor has a diagonal hole through it which matches the supposed practice of placing a stick in the mould when pouring in the molten tin. The stick would burn away leaving the hole which would be used to lever out the solid ingot from the mould and would later be useful to tie up the ingots for carriage. He speculated that it was the small surplus that remained after the normal ingots had been cast.

One of the best preserved blowing houses on Dartmoor is above Merrivale Bridge on the River Walkham. It has a mould stone close to its entrance and the wheel-pit can be easily traced. Some blowing houses also housed crushing ("knacking") or grinding ("crazing") mills, and at Gobbet Mine on the River Swincombe both the upper and lower grinding stones were found.

See also 

Dartmoor tin-mining
Blowing engine

References

Further reading
 Bryan Earl Cornish mining: the techniques of metal mining in the West of England, past and present; 2nd edition; Cornish Hillside Publications, 1994. .pp. 97, 97.1 with illustration.

Tin mining
Industrial furnaces
Mining in Cornwall
Dartmoor